Germaine Hoerner (26 January 1905 – 19 May 1972) was a French operatic soprano.

Biography 
Born in Strasbourg, Hoerner won First Prizes in singing and lyrical art at the Conservatoire de Paris, and made her debut at the Paris Opera in 1929 in Wagner's Die Walküre. She distinguished herself in the great Wagnerian roles, Elsa (Lohengrin), Elisabeth (Tannhäuser), Gutrune (Götterdämmerung) and Senta (Der fliegende Holländer) which she created at the Palais Garnier. Then she turned to the Italian bel canto, notably in the title role of Verdi's Aida, and Desdémone in Otello. She approached the French repertoire with Marguerite in Berlioz's La damnation de Faust, Valentine in Meyerbeer's Les Huguenots, Brunehild in Reyer's Sigurd, Bonté in Magnard's Guercœur, returned to the Germanic repertoire with Léonore in Beethoven's Fidelio, the Marschallin in Strauss's Der Rosenkavalier. In 1960, she retired from the stage and devoted herself to teaching in Strasbourg where she died in 1972.

References

Bibliography 
 Pâris, Alain, Dictionnaire des interprètes et de l'interpretation musicale au XX siècle (2 vols.), Ed. Robert Laffont (Bouquins, Paris 1982).

Musicians from Strasbourg
1905 births
1972 deaths
French operatic sopranos
Conservatoire de Paris alumni
French music educators
20th-century French women singers
Women music educators